The Taft Building is a historic twelve-story building at 6280 W. Hollywood Blvd. and 1680 North Vine Street, Hollywood and Vine, in Hollywood, California.

History
It was built for A.Z. Taft, Jr. (1889–1941), who purchased the Hollywood Memorial Church for US$125,000, tore it down, and commissioned the Taft Building thereby hiring architects Percy A. Eisen (1885–1946)  and Albert R. Walker (1881–1958). Construction ended in 1923.  The architecture firm Walker and Eisen was also responsible for the Fine Arts Building, the James Oviatt Building, the Hotel Normandie, the Beverly Wilshire Hotel, and the Commercial Exchange Building.

It is an example of Classical Revival architecture. Shortly after, all the movie studios had an office in the building. Clark Gable's dentist also had an office there. Additionally, Charlie Chaplin and Will Rogers had offices there. It has housed the Academy of Motion Picture Arts and Sciences.

It was the first high-rise office building in Los Angeles. It is opposite the Pantages Theatre, and Audrey Hepburn's star on the Hollywood Walk of Fame is outside the main entrance.

It has been on the list of Los Angeles Historic-Cultural Monuments in Hollywood since September 29, 1999.

In 2011, the owner, Langer Meringoff Properties, put it up for sale. The building was then purchased by DLJ Real Estate Capital Partners for $28.5 million, and spent $15 million renovating it, restoring many of its "historic architectural details".

In June 2018, Ocean West Capital Partners acquired the newly renovated Taft Building from DLJ Real Estate Capital Partners for $70 million in an off-market transaction.

References

External links

Office buildings completed in 1923
Buildings and structures in Hollywood, Los Angeles
Skyscraper office buildings in Los Angeles